Boys Don't Cry is a Polish movie directed by Olaf Lubaszenko. It was shot between June 9, 1999 and July 14, 1999 on location in Warszawa and Jelenia Góra. The film premiered on February 25, 2000, and has received a cult following over the years.

Plot 

A student of Fryderyk Chopin University of Music, Kuba Brenner, an aspiring violinist, finds out through his voicemail that his girlfriend Weronika left him forJarosław Keller, a local gangster. His car, a breaks down while trying to get to his violin exam, so he has to borrow another car from his friend, Cichy. He is late for his exam, so the doyen Zajączek does not allow him to take it, forbids Kuba from proceeding to the final exam, and withdraws him from the scholarship in France, which takes place once in four years.

At the same time Oskar, Kuba's friend, wants to cure acne at the dermatologist. He advises him to use some sex. Oskar is shy and has trouble talking to girls. When Kuba meets Oskar, he advises him to visit a brothel. The two arrange a visit at Oskar's uncle home, where also lives his cousin, Laska. They order two girls - Lili for Oskar and Angelika for Kuba. In the evening, chef of the brothel, Czesiek, brings the girls to the house. Kuba is not glad about the meeting, but Oskar and Lili seem to hit it off well. After an hour, Czesiek comes back for the girls and payment. They pay 200 złotys, but Czesiek says that it should be 200 US dollars. They do not have enough money, so Czesiek decides to take a precious golden figure of a wizard from Africa, which belongs to Oskar's uncle. After that, the boys try to retrieve the figure. Kuba sells his violin in a pawnshop, which he now considers to be useless.

After that, Kuba visits the club "Czarny Lotos" to retrieve the figure. At the same time, an arranged visit of two gangsters from Szczecin - Fred and Grucha, who want to make a deal worth 1.5 million złotys, is taking place. The chef does not want to make it personally, so he deputes his 30-year son, Bolec, whom he wants to see as a worthy successor. Bolec, however, is not interested in the gangster life. His hobby is watching TV, especially rap music on MTV and gangster films. The deal between the guest gangsters and Bolec finishes as failure, because they consider him a crock and do not understand his fascination with rap music made by black people. They are also angry that he deceived them with his dog's breed and the fake tattoo on his arm. He also wasted some crack which they regaled him, and mistook a film which he wanted to show them ("Death in Venice" is not a gangster film, as he thought, but a psychological drama), so they refuse to make the deal. At the same time, Kuba enters the room, so Fred orders Bolec to shoot him. He mistakenly shoots Grucha, which results in a shootout where Czesiek, Grucha, and Bolec all get injured. Kuba runs away from the club, but his car breaks down again and he borrows yet another car.

Grucha, shot in the head, survives due to a titan plate implanted in his frontal lobe, but he loses his memory. Fred notices that the luggage with the money disappeared. He claims that Kuba has stolen it, so chef orders to find and kill him. Kuba realises what could happen to him, so he visits Laska, who gives him a marijuana joint and advises him that he should do anything that he wants in his life. Kuba also meets with Cichy, who gives him a gun. Shortly after that, Bolec finds Kuba and takes him to a forest outside Warsaw to kill him. He refuses to do it, when he finds out that Kuba likes classical Polish music, just as he does. Kuba advises him to start playing music professionally. Meanwhile, Fred and Grucha find Kuba's documents in his Volkswagen, which he left, so they start looking for him. A few days later, Kuba receives a letter saying that he qualified for the scholarship in France, but his flat is occupied by Fred. Kuba runs away to the roof, but suddenly there comes Weronika, who has recently finished her relationship with Jarosław - as it turned out that he is not actually a gangster, and his real surname is not Keller, but Psikuta ("psi kutas" in Polish means dog's cock). Kuba stays in the cornice on the highest floor, Fred goes down onto the street and starts to threaten that he will kill Weronika if Kuba does not get down from the roof. Kuba decides to comply, so Fred catches him and puts him in the trunk of his black Alfa Romeo. He drives with Grucha to the old bunkers in Brzózki Stare near Warsaw, where they want to kill and bury Kuba.

Kuba in the trunk phones Oskar and wants him to call the police, but Laska, who is smoking marijuana with his friends (Bąbel and Surfer) picks up instead. Laska and friends claim that they will help him alone without the police's help. After they come to the place of the planned crime, Fred is angry at Grucha and throws out Grucha's last cigarette, as he does not allow him to smoke in his car. Kuba lends his own cigarette, which is actually a marijuana joint, which Laska has given to him prior. Grucha starts to behave unreasonably, meanwhile Fred starts laughing at Grucha's pink sweater with a pear (a visual pun, grucha means "pear" in polish), which was a gift from Angelika whom he got to know at the club shortly before the shootout. When it is time for Kuba to be killed by Fred, Grucha kills Fred instead for joking about his sweater. Meanwhile, when Laska and friends are driving to help Kuba, they are stopped by a police patrol. The policemen are drunk and have to come home, so the boys have to tow a police car. Later the boys, due to being high, think that they are being chased by the police, so they speed up to the maximal speed. A tow rope snaps and the police car lands directly at place of the crime, also hitting Fred's car and revealing that the luggage with the money was in the trunk of Fred's car all along. The policemen arrest Grucha.

When Kuba is at the airport, leaving to France, he meets his rector Rudolf, who is leaving to Milan. He finds out from him that Zajączek made problems because he does not like Kuba personally and he also does not like Kuba's father, who is a world-class conductor and Rudolf's friend. Zajączek was also very angry when he found out about Kuba's success during his stay in the US, so in his fury he caused a car accident. Kuba then meets Oskar and Lili, who have started a relationship. Lili is also pregnant. Bolec decides to end with the gangster life and begins a career in music. Laska and his friends mistakenly drive to the Baltic Sea.

Cast 
 Maciej Stuhr – Kuba Brenner
 Wojciech Klata – Oskar
 Tomasz Bajer – Laska
 Cezary Pazura – Fred
 Mirosław Zbrojewicz – Grucha
 Michał Milowicz – Bolec
 Anna Mucha – Lili
 Bohdan Łazuka – chef
 Andrzej Zieliński – Silnoręki
 Mariusz Czajka – Alfons Czesiek
 Mirosław Baka – Cichy, Kuba's friend
 Tadeusz Huk – older policeman
 Radosław Pazura – young policeman
 Paweł Nowisz – Dziekan Zajączek
 Edward Linde-Lubaszenko – rector Rudolf
 Asja Łamtiugina – Professor
 Magdalena Mazur – Weronika
 Monika Ambroziak – Cycofon
 Paweł Deląg – Jarek Psikuta
 Leon Niemczyk – "Król Sedesów", Laska's father
Krzysztof Kosedowski – Gray

Video game
In 2005, Chłopaki Nie Płaczą, a video game based on the film, was published.

Sources

External links 
 

 Chłopaki nie płaczą a on Filmweb

2000 films
Polish crime comedy films
2000s crime comedy films
Films set in Poland
2000 comedy films